Alfred Smalley (born 4 June 1999) is a Niue international rugby league footballer who plays as a er or  for the North Sydney Bears in the NSW Cup. 

He previously played for the Manly-Warringah Sea Eagles in the NRL.

Playing career

2022
Smalley made his first grade debut in round 20 of the 2022 NRL season for Manly against the Sydney Roosters scoring a try in a 20-10 loss.
In November, Smalley signed a contract to join North Sydney in the NSW Cup.

References

External links
Profile at NSWRL

1999 births
Living people
Manly Warringah Sea Eagles players
Niue national rugby league team players
Rugby league wingers
Rugby league centres
Rugby league players from Auckland